The Third Mind Movements is the final album released by British industrial group Throbbing Gristle in April 2009 from recordings made at the 2007 Desertshore Installation at the Institute of Contemporary Art on 1 to 3 June 2007 - all of the original line-up were present. It was for sale only at the 2009 USA tour venues and was later sold through the band's website.

Track listing
"The Man from Nowhere" – 7:20
"Premature" – 8:36
"Secluded" – 7:08
"Perception is the Only Reality" – 9:51
"Not That I Am" – 4:33
"First Movement" – 8:00
"Second Movement" – 7:07
"Third Movement" – 7:29

See also
Throbbing Gristle discography

References
CD entries at Discogs: 

2009 albums
Throbbing Gristle albums
Industrial Records albums